Frederic (or Frederick) Dan Huntington (May 28, 1819, Hadley, Massachusetts – July 11, 1904, Hadley, Massachusetts) was an American clergyman and the first Protestant Episcopal bishop of the Episcopal Diocese of Central New York.

Early life, education and career
Frederic Dan, the youngest of the eleven children born to Dan and Elizabeth Huntington, was born in Hadley, Massachusetts on May 28, 1819. He grew up on the family farm "Forty Acres," the home of both his mother and his grandmother, Elizabeth Porter Phelps.

He graduated at Amherst College in 1839 and at the Harvard Divinity School in 1842. In 1843 he married Hannah Sargent, the sister of Epes Sargent. From 1842 to 1855 he was pastor of the South Congregational Church of Boston, and in 1855-1860 as preacher to the university and Plummer professor of Christian Morals at Harvard; he then left the Unitarian Church, with which his father had been connected as a clergyman at Hadley, resigned his professorship and became pastor of the newly established Emmanuel Church of Boston.

Syracuse, New York 

Rev. Huntington founded the St. John's School, a military school, in 1869 in Manlius, New York, and was its president until his death in 1904. In the 1920s, St. John's became known as the renowned military school, The Manlius School, today integrated into the Manlius Pebble Hill School.

He had refused the bishopric of the Episcopal Diocese of Maine when, in 1868, he was elected to the Diocese of Central New York. He was consecrated on April 9, 1869, and thereafter lived in Syracuse, New York.

He was the first president of the Church Association for the Advancement of the Interests of Labor.

Consecrators
 The Most Reverend Benjamin B. Smith
 The Right Reverend Manton Eastburn
 The Right Reverend Horatio Potter
N.B.: 93rd bishop consecrated in the Episcopal Church.

End of life 
Huntington remained throughout his life attached to the family's ancestral farm in Hadley, Massachusetts, in the 1860s purchasing his siblings' shares so that he could inherit the house.  He continued to manage it as a working farm, and spent summers there throughout his life.  Huntington died in Hadley on July 11, 1904, aged 85.

Publications 

His more important publications included:

 Lectures on Human Society (1860)
 Memorials of a Quiet Life (1874)
 The Golden Rule applied to Business and Social Conditions (1892)

From 1845 to 1858 he was the editor of The Monthly Religious Magazine, a Unitarian review.

Legacy 
Huntington's ancestral family home, the Porter-Phelps-Huntington House in Hadley, became a historic house museum in the 1940s, and is open seasonally. His daughter Ruth Huntington Sessions wrote a memoir, Sixty Odd (1936), which includes details about her childhood with Huntington.

See also

 List of Bishop Succession in the Episcopal Church

References

Notes

Further reading
 Christian Believing and Living: Sermons by Frederic Dan Huntington (Harvard, 1860), Original from Harvard, digitized by google books on Oct. 19, 2006.
 Elim: or, Hymns of Holy Refreshment, ed. Rev. F.D. Huntington. Boston: Dutton, 1865.
 Memoir and Letters of Frederic Dan Huntington (Boston, 1906), by Arria S. Huntington, his daughter.
 The Episcopal Church Annual. Morehouse Publishing: New York, NY (2005).

External links

 The sermons and addresses by Frederic Dan Huntington are at the Harvard Divinity School Library at Harvard Divinity School in Cambridge, Massachusetts.

1819 births
1904 deaths
People from Hadley, Massachusetts
Harvard Divinity School alumni
Amherst College alumni
Clergy from Boston
19th-century Anglican bishops in the United States
Religious leaders from Syracuse, New York
Education in Onondaga County, New York
Manlius Pebble Hill School
Converts to Anglicanism from Unitarianism
Episcopal bishops of Central New York